Heliocles II Dicaeus (epithet means "the just") is thought to have been one of the later Indo-Greek kings and a relative of the Bactrian king Heliocles I. Current scholarly consensus is that he ruled ca 95–80 BCE.

Heliocles II seems to have been engaged in a series of wars with Strato I in Gandhara and Punjab; the two share several mintmarks and Heliocles II overstruck many of his coins. During this period, a number of kings fought for hegemony in the Indo-Greek territories. Some of them were likely supported by nomad Saka rulers such as Maues.

Genealogy
Heliocles II used a reverse of standing Zeus, who was a common deity among the later Indo-Greek kings. J. Jakobsson sees Heliocles as the son of the important king Antialcidas Nikephoros (whose type was sitting Zeus) and perhaps the grandson of Heliocles I.

He goes on to suggest that Heliocles was the older brother of the king Archebius Nikephoros Dikaios, who seems to have succeeded Heliocles II in Gandhara (perhaps after his death from disease; Heliocles I looks emaciated on his later portraits). Archebius uses a very similar reverse and combines the epithets of Heliocles II and Antialcidas; in addition, their coin portraits are similar, with hooked noses and fierce expressions.

R.C. Senior has instead suggested a connection with Demetrius III, who used a similar reverse of standing Zeus.

Coins of Heliocles II
Heliocles II issued Indian silver with portrait (diademed, helmeted or spear-throwing) / standing Zeus and bronzes with bearded diademed portrait (Heliocles or Zeus) / elephant.

It is uncertain whether he struck Attic coins. A number of posthumous coins for Heliocles I have been found in Bactria; possibly some of these may have been struck by Heliocles II, though there are no similar monograms.

Overstrikes
The existence of numerous overstrikes helps locate the reign of Heliocles II in relation to other Indo-Greek kings. Heliocles overstruck coins of Agathokleia, Strato I, and Hermaeus. Conversely, Amyntas overstruck coins of Heliocles II. These overstrikes suggest that Heliocles II reigned around 95–85 BCE and was a contemporary of Amyntas and Hermaeus

See also
 Greco-Bactrian Kingdom
 Seleucid Empire
 Greco-Buddhism
 Indo-Scythians
 Indo-Parthian Kingdom
 Kushan Empire

Notes

References
 
 
 

Indo-Greek kings
1st-century BC rulers in Asia
2nd-century BC rulers in Asia
Diodotid dynasty